Œuilly may refer to the following places in France:

 Œuilly, Aisne, a commune in the department of Aisne
 Œuilly, Marne, a commune in the department of Marne